Bozağaç is a village in the Çemişgezek District, Tunceli Province, Turkey. The village is populated by Turks and had a population of 81 in 2021.

The hamlets of Hüngürlü and Keşiş are attached to the village.

References 

Villages in Çemişgezek District